FOXP4 antisense RNA 1 is a protein that in humans is encoded by the FOXP4-AS1 gene.

References

Further reading